was an admiral in the Imperial Japanese Navy during World War II.

Biography
Rokuzō Sugiyama was born in Tokyo as the son of a bureaucrat in the Ministry of Agriculture and Commerce, Sugimoto was a graduated of the 38th class of the Imperial Japanese Naval Academy in July 1910, ranked second in his class of 147 cadets. After graduation from Gunnery and Torpedo School in early 1914, he was assigned to the destroyers  and  during World War I. From June 1918, he served as a foreign naval observer in the Netherlands, and was member of the Japanese delegation at the Versailles Treaty negotiations in 1920.

After graduation from the Naval Staff College in December 1922, he was promoted to lieutenant commander, and was captain of the destroyer  in 1924. Sugiyama was promoted to commander in December 1926, and captain in December 1930, serving in various staff positions within the Imperial Japanese Navy General Staff, and as an instructor at the Naval Staff College from 1930-1933.

From November 1936, Sugiyama was appointed Chief of Staff of the IJN 3rd Fleet, and was thus in a senior command position of Japanese naval forces in China during the early stages of the Second Sino-Japanese War. He was appointed to make a formal apology to the United States over the USS Panay incident in 1937. Sugiyama rose to vice admiral on November 15, 1940. On July 5, 1941, Sugiyama was appointed Commander-in-chief of the IJN 3rd Fleet.

Following the start of the Pacific War, on January 3, 1942, Sugiyama accepted the post of commander in chief of the IJN 3rd Expeditionary Fleet. However, in December 1942, he returned to a shore position with the Naval Shipbuilding Command, of which he became Commandant from April 15, 1943 to November 4, 1944. He was subsequently commander of the Sasebo Naval District until the end of the war.

Notes

References

External links

 

1890 births
1947 deaths
People from Tokyo
Imperial Japanese Navy admirals
Japanese admirals of World War II